The 2009 LKL Finals was the championship series of the Lithuanian Basketball League's 2008–09 LKL season, and the conclusion of the season's playoffs. Lietuvos Rytas won the series against Žalgiris, 4–1.  The games were broadcast on LTV with Linas Kunigėlis as the announcer.

Lietuvos krepšinio lyga Finals
Finals